Ruseşti may refer to several villages in Romania:

 Ruseşti, a village in Albac Commune, Alba County
 Ruseşti, a village in Bulzeștii de Sus Commune, Hunedoara County
 Ruseştii Noi, a commune in Ialoveni district, Moldova

See also 
Rus (surname)
Rusu (disambiguation)
Rusca (disambiguation)
Ruseni (disambiguation)
Rusciori (disambiguation)